Sailing at the 2013 Island Games took place at the Spanish Point Boat Club in Pembroke Parish, Bermuda. Competition took place from 14 to 19 July 2013.

Medal table

Medal summary

Events

References

2013 Island Games
2013 in sailing
2013
Sailing competitions in Bermuda